Ante Up is a 1974 Italian comedy film directed by Paolo Nuzzi. It was entered into the 25th Berlin International Film Festival.

Plot
During the Mussolini era some young people meet frequently. They exchange stories about recent events while playing cards. Between their meetings they have different kinds of adventures.

Cast
 Aldo Maccione - Camola
 Agostina Belli - Ines
 Andréa Ferréol - Lirica, the singer
 Erminio Macario - Brovelli, the fool (as Macario)
  - Rimediotti
 Franco Diogene - Peppino, the barber
 Claudio Gora - the doctor
 Guido Leontini - Spreafico
 Armando Brancia - Giuseppe Migliavacca
 Daniele Vargas - the lawyer
 Maria Antonietta Beluzzi - Mamma Rosa
 Alessandra Cardini - (as Sandra Cardini)
 Nazzareno Natale - Bertinelli, the groom
 Giuseppe Maffioli - Venezia
 Bernard Blier - the priest
  - the photographer

References

External links

Ante Up at Variety Distribution

1974 films
1970s Italian-language films
1974 comedy films
Films directed by Paolo Nuzzi
Commedia all'italiana
Films scored by Franco Micalizzi
1970s Italian films